The Bessamatic was an 35mm SLR camera made by Voigtländer in the 1960s, featuring a selenium meter.
It uses a leaf shutter rather than the more common (in SLR cameras) focal plane shutter. This is a Synchro-Compur shutter mounted behind the lens, which is interchangeable. The shutter speeds go from "B" to 1/500. 
The most common lenses found on the Bessamatic are the Color-Lanthar, Color-Skopar, and Color-Skopar X all of which are 50mm focal length f/2.8 although the 50mm f/2 Septon is also fitted to these cameras, and is highly prized. 
The 35mm Skoparex is unusual, but not hard to find.
The 135mm f/4 Super-Dynarex is relatively common, although the 200mm and 350mm Super-Dynarex lenses are relatively rare and expensive. 
The Bessamatic was the first SLR to be fitted with a zoom lens, the Zoomar. This is a highly sought after collectible and is quite expensive.

The Bessamatic has a reputation as a tricky camera to repair, although if looked after it can be reliable and pleasant to use. It is certainly worth seeking out someone familiar with this model for servicing and repair, as the reputation is not totally unfounded. The mechanism is very precisely made with many small components and can be damaged if any of the controls are forced. This can easily turn a minor repair into a camera fit for spare parts use.

There is also a Bessamatic CS – which has TTL CdS metering, typically fitted with a Color-Lanthar 50 mm/f2.8 lens. This was made only for a short time and is relatively uncommon.

The Bessamatic m was an entry level model which has no meter at all, and is uncommon today.

Lenses

List of Voigtländer Bessamatic/Ultramatic SLR DKL-mount lenses:

Voigtländer Skoparex 35mm f3.4 (I: 0.9/1m or 3 ft; II: 0.9/1m and 3 ft; III: 0.9/1m and 3 ft + bigger ring; IV: 0.4m and 1.5 ft + bigger ring)
Voigtländer Skopagon 40mm f2.0 (I: 0.9m or 3 ft; II: 0.9m and 3 ft; III: 0.5m and 2 ft)
Voigtländer Color-Skopar X 50mm f2.8 (I: 0.9/1m or 3 ft; II: 0.9/1m and 3 ft; III: 0.9/1m and 3 ft + bigger ring; IV: 0.6m and 2 ft + bigger ring)
Voigtländer Color-Skopar 50mm f2.8 (0.6m and 2 ft + bigger ring; since ca. 1965)
Voigtländer Color-Lanthar 50mm f2.8 (for Bessamatic m)
Voigtländer Septon 50mm f2.0 (I: 0.9m or 3 ft; II: 0.9m and 3 ft; III: 0.6m and 2 ft)
Voigtländer Dynarex 90mm f3.4
Voigtländer Dynarex 100mm f4.8
Voigtländer Super-Dynarex 135mm f4.0 (I: 4m or 13 ft; II: 4m and 13 ft)
Voigtländer Super-Dynarex 200mm f4.0
Voigtländer Super-Dynarex 350mm f5.6
Voigtländer Zoomar 36–82mm f2.8

Originally, the lenses were labelled with either metric or imperial distance scales (type I). Later versions featured both (type II and higher). Some later types also had a thicker ring. Some of the lenses had better close focusing capabilities in late types. Lenses produced after 1959 are marked with a yellow dot, indicating the presence of a special cutout to transfer a lens's maximum aperture (2, 2.8, 3.4, or 4 and higher) for use with the Ultramatic and Ultramatic CS.

List of Carl Zeiss Bessamatic/Ultramatic SLR DKL-mount lenses:

Carl Zeiss Planar 50mm f2.0 (prototype only)
Carl Zeiss Tessar 50mm f2.8 (prototype only)

List of Voigtländer Vitessa T rangefinder DKL-mount lenses:

Voigtländer Skoparet 35mm f3.4
Voigtländer Color-Skopar 50mm f2.8
Voigtländer Dynaret 100mm f4.8
Voigtländer Super-Dynaret 135mm f4.0

Lenses for the Vitessa T feature an aperture ring of their own. They are not compatible with Bessamatic lenses.

See also
Bessamatic and lenses in apenasimagens.com
Voigtländer Ultramatic

References

Bessamatic
135 film cameras